Aulus (abbreviated A.) is one of the small group of common forenames found in the culture of ancient Rome.

The name was traditionally connected with Latin aula, olla, "palace", but this is most likely a false etymology. Aulus in fact probably derives from Etruscan Aule, Avle, Avile, of unknown meaning. 

Aulus may refer to:

 Aulus Agerius or Numerius Negidius (a name for the plaintiff in a lawsuit)
 Aulus Atilius Calatinus
 Aulus Avilius Flaccus
 Aulus Ofilius
 Aulus Caecina Alienus
 Aulus Caecina Severus (suffect consul 1 BC)
 Aulus Caecina Severus (writer)
 Aulus Cornelius Celsus
 Aulus Cornelius Cossus
 Aulus Cremutius Cordus
 Aulus Didius Gallus
 Aulus Didius Gallus Fabricius Veiento
 Aulus Gabinius
 Aulus Gellius
 Aulus Hirtius - consul after Caesar
 Aulus Licinius Archias
 Aulus Licinius Nerva Silianus
 Aulus Metellus or Aule Metele
 Aulus Paulinus - fictional governor of Britain in Chelmsford 123
 Aulus Persius Flaccus
 Aulus Platorius Nepos
 Aulus Plautius
 Aulus Terentius Varro Murena
 Aulus Vitellius